Pakeezah is a Pakistani thriller drama serial that was first aired on  11 February 2016 on Hum TV. It stars Adnan Siddiqui, Aamina Sheikh, Alyy Khan, Angeline Malik. The series revolves around the struggle of a female artist between her passion and her relationship with her husband. The drama's song is based on the song Dhoondo Ge Agar by Abida Parveen.

Synopsis
The drama is based on strained relations between Pakeeza (Aamina Sheikh) and Jibran (Alyy Khan). They have a daughter Kiran who is irritated of Jibran torturing Pakeeza day by day. Jibran has a sister Naima (Angeline Malik) who is married to Ahmer (Khaled Anam) and has a daughter, Shehzadi/Maham. Kiran likes Shehzadi and her parents than her parents. Ahmer has a brother Azeem (Adnan Siddiqui) who befriends with Pakeeza. Each episode of drama includes fight between Pakeeza and Jibran.

Plot 
The drama revolves around the woman, Pakeeza (Aamina Sheikh) who is a painter and housewife. Her paintings are good and she is awarded many times in the media because of her talent. She is married to Jibran (Alyy Khan), a misogynist, who cares less about his wife and beats her lot because she has fame. Pakeeza has a daughter, Kiran, who is depressed in listening to her parents' fights. Pakeeza is the best friend of Naima (Angeline Malik), who later becomes her sister-in-law as Naima's brother Jibran comes in her life. She finds solace in her friend Azeem (Adnan Siddiqui) who helps her in every difficulty.

Cast 
 Aamina Sheikh as Pakeezah
 Ali Khan as Jibran
 Adnan Siddiqui as Azeem
 Angeline Malik as Naima 
 Khaled Anam as Ahmer
 Iqra Chaudhry as Kiran Jibran
 Sohail Hashmi as Sohail “Talpur Sahab”
 Mariam Mirza as Aisha Talpur
 Sara Asim as Shahzadi
 Faseeh Sardar as Saif 
 Awais Waseer

Digital release 
The series was made available on iflix however in 2019 all the episodes were pulled off. Still, it is available on Indian streaming platform MX Player.

See also 
 List of programs broadcast by Hum TV
 2016 in Pakistani television

References

External links 
 

Hum TV
Hum Network Limited
Hum TV original programming
Pakistani romantic drama television series
Pakistani family television dramas
Pakistani telenovelas
MD Productions
Television series by MD Productions
2016 Pakistani television series debuts
2016 Pakistani television series endings